In Greek mythology, Xenodice or Xenodike (Ancient Greek: Ξενοδίκη) may refer to the following characters:

 Xenodice, a Cretan princess as the daughter of King Minos either by Pasiphae or Crete. She was the sister of Acacallis, Ariadne, Androgeus, Deucalion, Phaedra, Glaucus and Catreus.
 Xenodice, a Trojan captive. (see List of children of Priam)

Notes

References 

 Apollodorus, The Library with an English Translation by Sir James George Frazer, F.B.A., F.R.S. in 2 Volumes, Cambridge, MA, Harvard University Press; London, William Heinemann Ltd. 1921. ISBN 0-674-99135-4. Online version at the Perseus Digital Library. Greek text available from the same website.
Pausanias, Description of Greece with an English Translation by W.H.S. Jones, Litt.D., and H.A. Ormerod, M.A., in 4 Volumes. Cambridge, MA, Harvard University Press; London, William Heinemann Ltd. 1918. . Online version at the Perseus Digital Library
Pausanias, Graeciae Descriptio. 3 vols. Leipzig, Teubner. 1903.  Greek text available at the Perseus Digital Library.

Princesses in Greek mythology
People of the Trojan War
Cretan characters in Greek mythology
Mythology of Heracles